Delmenhorst (Northern Low Saxon: Demost) is an urban district (Kreisfreie Stadt) in Lower Saxony, Germany.

Since 2021 the mayor has been Petra Gerlach (CDU).

History

Delmenhorst was first mentioned in a charter in 1254, after the Count of Oldenburg, Otto I, bought the place near the river Delme in 1234. A castle to protect the newly founded settlement was established in about 1247. The following count, Otto II, made the castle his residency; Delmenhorst was declared an independent town on 15 July 1371 under Bremen's law.

After a short period under the governance of the bishop of Bremen from 1421 to 1436 Delmenhorst returned under the custody of Oldenburg. Delmenhorst later was infamous for its robber-baronship under the count Gerhard VI of Oldenburg. Its reign ended in 1482 thanks to a siege laid to the castle under the leadership of the bishop of Münster. Therefore, the town now was under Münster authority until finally count Anton I won back the town as well as the castle in 1547.

When the last heir of Anton, Christian, died in 1647, Delmenhorst again fell under Oldenburg custody. As Oldenburg belonged to Danish kings and the Oldenburg regent of that time was a relative of the Danish king, Delmenhorst was thereafter under Danish control.

In 1767 Delmenhorst was bought by Tsarina Catherine II, but was given up to new Oldenburg in 1773. In 1777 Delmenhorst was declared a dukedom of Oldenburg. In 1806 a French and Dutch army occupied the territory; Delmenhorst was a part of the French empire under Napoleon from 1811 to 1813.

In the industrial age Delmenhorst experienced great economic growth, thanks to Bremen. Since Bremen was in a different duty zone, merchants who wanted to export manufactured goods outside of Bremen had to pay high customs duties. They therefore only exported the resources and produced their commodities in the surrounding villages. The industries arising were the Jute - a spinning works and weavery in 1871, the Delmenhorster Linoleumfabrik - a linoleum factory, in 1882, the Norddeutsche Wollkämmerei und Kammgarnspinnerei or Nordwolle - another, bigger spinning works, and several others. The number of inhabitants quadrupled in these years.

In 1903 Delmenhorst was declared kreisfrei, meaning it was under its own regentship, not having to obey any other county. In the 1930s Great Depression the Nordwolle went bankrupt - nevertheless the town grew bigger, incorporating several smaller villages around it. On Kristallnacht in November 1938 the synagogue was burnt down by the Nazis, who had come to power in Germany in 1933. After the Second World War, Delmenhorst was in the British zone of occupation and had to deal with thousands of refugees from Eastern Germany, which now was occupied by the Soviet Union. The British-appointed mayor during the British Occupation was Major Jack Wolfe, an inspector of the British Constabulary. In 1950, more than 57,000 people lived in Delmenhorst.

Since the 1960s there has been a steady decrease in employment, leaving more than 13% of the town's inhabitants unemployed and nearly 7% living on social welfare. In the year 2000 Delmenhorst was an outpost of the Hanover-based Expo 2000.

The Hanse-Wissenschaftskolleg (HWK) Institute for Advanced Study is located at Delmenhorst, in the neighborhood of Deichhorst. The HWK promotes collaboration between and among international research scientists and artists, many of whom are housed on the HWK grounds. The public is engaged through a public lecture series. The research areas of focus are energy, earth, brain, and society.

Mayors
Wilhelm Müller: 1933–1937
Hermann Maas: 1937–1945
Walter Kleine: 1945–1945
Johann Schmidt(1870-1949): 1945–1946
Wilhelm von der Heyde: 1946–1955
Anton Eickmeier (1912-1955): 1955–1955
Hans Albers: 1955–1956
Wilhelm von der Heyde (1885-1972): 1956–1968
Ernst Eckert (1904-2004): 1968–1974
Harald Groth (born 1943): 1974–1976
Otto Jenzok (1928-1984): 1976–1984
Walter Löwe: 1984–1986
Erwin Pelka: 1986–1986
Jürgen Thölke (born 1934): 1986–2001
Carsten Schwettmann: 2001–2006
Patrick de La Lanne (born 1962): 2006–2014
Axel Jahnz: 2014-2021
Petra Gerlach: since 2021

Main sights
The landmark of the town is the water tower complex with the adjacent town hall, built from 1910 to 1914 by architect Heinz Stoffregen.

Another interesting place is the Burginsel (Castle Island), in which the old castle existed in medieval times. The construction was torn down during the 18th century. Today a park (called the Graft) occupies the grounds of the old castle.

The industrial history of the town is presented by the Nordwolle Museum, an Anchor Point of ERIH, The European Route of Industrial Heritage.

Twin towns – sister cities

Delmenhorst is twinned with:
 Allonnes, France
 Borisoglebsk, Russia
 Eberswalde, Germany
 Kolding, Denmark
 Lublin, Poland

Notable people

Hermann Rieck (c. 1837-1921), farmer
Arthur Fitger (1840–1909), painter

Iwan Bloch (1872–1922), physician and sexologist
Fritz Stuckenberg (1881–1944), painter
Reinhard Kuretzky (born 1947), athlete, pole vaulter
Wolfgang Michels (1951–2017), musician, singer, composer and author
Volker Wieker (born 1954), General Inspector of the Bundeswehr
Gerd U. Auffarth (born 1964), Professor of Ophthalmology, Heidelberg University
Claudia Kemfert (born 1968), environmental economist and energy expert
Tim Fischer (born 1973), composer
Ernst-Marcus Thomas (born 1973), television presenter

Associated with the city
Gerhard VI, Count of Oldenburg (1430–1500), ruler of the castle of Delmenhorst
Henrich Focke (1890–1979), co-founder of the company Focke-Achgelis in Hoykenkamp (Ganderkesee)
Walter Többens (1909–1954), textile entrepreneur with production and trading
Hans-Joachim Hespos (1938–2022), composer, founded the concert series 11.11 new music in Delmenhorst
Sarah Connor (born 1980), singer and since 2003 "honorary messenger" of the city

References

External links

 Delmenhorst Homepage
 webcam providing a view over the market place from the top of the town hall 
 Search in the Delmenhorster Bibliography (the total bibliography as PDF (461 kB))

Grand Duchy of Oldenburg